Adam Kraft (or Krafft) (c. 1460?January 1509) was a German stone sculptor and master builder of the late Gothic period, based in Nuremberg and with a documented career there from 1490.

It is not known where Kraft was born and raised; his hand has been claimed to be evident as an assistant in works in Ulm Minster (completed 1471) and the pulpit at Strasbourg Cathedral, completed in 1485.  Kraft is believed to have married twice, but is not known to have produced any children. All his known works are in stone, but he may also have carved unidentified pieces in wood.

The tabernacle, that has the shape of a gothic tower reaching into the church's vault, is made up of tracery interspersed with figural scenes from Christ's Passion and was commissioned in 1493 by Hans Imhoff, a patrician from Nuremberg. The contract for the commission was preserved and stipulates details about the execution and finish of the work. The stone tower, which is supported by three figures, was lightly damaged during World War II and restored afterwards. One of the supporting figures is a self-portrait by Kraft (at right). Another important work is a huge relief of 1490-92 depicting the Crucifixion, Entombment of Christ, and Resurrection of Christ, on the exterior of St. Sebaldus Church, Nuremberg.

Kraft is believed to have completed all of his sculpting work in Nuremberg and its environs in Bavaria, between the years 1490 and 1509, working with only a small complement of two or three assistants. His other significant works were the monumental reliefs in the various churches in Nuremberg. He produced the great Schreyer monument in 1492 for St. Sebaldus Church and Christ bearing the Cross above the altar of the same church. He also made various works for public and private buildings, such as the relief over the door of the Wagehaus, a Saint George and the Dragon, several Madonnas, and other purely decorative pieces. The great tabernacle, covered in statuettes, in Ulm Minster, and the very spirited Stations of the Cross, on the road to the Nuremberg cemetery, are also his.

He is buried in nearby Schwabach. Many of his pieces are exhibited at the Nuremberg museum, the Germanisches Nationalmuseum.

Notes

References

Schleif, Corine. "Does Religion Matter? Adam Kraft's Eucharistic Tabernacle and Eobanus Hessus", in: Art, Piety and Destruction in the Christian West, 1500–1700, edited by Virginia Chieffo Raguin, Farnham 2010, 45–63.
Schleif, Corine. "The Many Wives of Adam Kraft: Renaissance Artists' Wives in Legal Documents, Art-historical Scholarship, and Historical Fiction", revised version reprinted in the anthology: Saints, Sinners and Sisters. Women and the Pictorial Arts in Northern European Art, edited by Jane Carroll and Alison Stewart, Basingstoke 2003, 202–22.
Schleif, Corine. "Rituale in Stein: Erzählungen für eine breite und diverse Öffentlichkeit" ("Rituals in Stone: Narratives for a Widely Diverse Public"), in: Adam Kraft Colloquium, edited by Frank Matthias Kammel, Nuremberg 2002, 253–70.
Schleif, Corine. "Wem Gehört Adam Kraft? Zum Umgang mit Kraft und Seinen Werken in Wort und Tat" ("To Whom Did Adam Kraft Belong? Words and Deeds Engaging Adam Kraft and his Work"), in: Adam Kraft Colloquium, edited by Frank Matthias Kammel, Nuremberg 2002, 31–44.
Schleif, Corine. "Nicodemus and Sculptors: Self-Reflexivity in Works by Adam Kraft and Tilman Riemenschneider", in: Art Bulletin 75 (1993), 599–626.
Snyder, James; Northern Renaissance Art, 1985, Harry N. Abrams, 
Translation of German Wikipedia article (July 23, 2005) using Google translation tools.

1450s births
1509 deaths
15th-century German sculptors
German male sculptors
16th-century German sculptors
Gothic sculptors
Artists from Nuremberg
Catholic sculptors